Lazar Abramovich Shatskin (Russian: Лазарь Абрамович Шацкин; born in Suwałki in 1902) was a Soviet and Communist International  functionary and one of the founders of Komsomol.

He was born to a wealthy family of Polish Jewish origin. Joining the Bolshevik party in May 1917, he took part in establishment a number of youth organizations: МК РКСМ (Russian Young Communist League by the Moscow Committee of Bolshevik Party), Moscow Union of Working Youth, Komsomol, and the Young Communist International.

First Secretary of the YCI (1919-1921), First Secretary of the Central Committee of the Russian Young Communist League (ЦК РКСМ, 1921-1922).

In 1930 he was a member of a group in opposition to Joseph Stalin, which Stalin described as "Right-Leftist bloc" (Право-левацкий блок). In 1935 he was arrested, expelled from the Party, and shot in 1937.

References

1902 births
1937 deaths
People from Suwałki
People from Suwałki Governorate
Jews from the Russian Empire
Soviet Jews
Old Bolsheviks
Komsomol
Comintern people
Great Purge victims from Poland
Soviet people of Polish-Jewish descent
Jews executed by the Soviet Union
Jewish socialists